This article contains a list of choir schools sorted alphabetically by country.

Australia
St Andrew's Cathedral School, Sydney
St Mary's Cathedral College, Sydney
Xavier High School, Albury, NSW
St John's Cathedral Choir School, Brisbane

Austria
Vienna Boys' Choir, Vienna

Canada
Royal St. George's College, Toronto
St. Michael's Choir School, Toronto

Czech Republic
Boni Pueri, the Czech Boys Choir, Hradec Králové

Denmark
Copenhagen Boys Choir

Germany
Kreuzschule, Dresden
Thomasschule zu Leipzig, Leipzig
Gymnasium der Regensburger Domspatzen, Regensburg

Latvia
Riga Cathedral Choir School

New Zealand
 The Cathedral Grammar School
 Sacred Heart Cathedral School, Thorndon

South Africa
 Drakensberg Boys' Choir School

United Kingdom
 Bristol Cathedral Choir School
 The Cathedral School, Llandaff, Cardiff (C of E)
 Christ Church Cathedral School, Oxford
 Exeter Cathedral School
 Hereford Cathedral School
 King's College School, Cambridge
 King's Ely
 The King's School, Gloucester
 The King's (The Cathedral) School, Peterborough
 The King's School, Rochester, Rochester
 The King's School, Worcester
 Lanesborough School, Guildford
 Lichfield Cathedral School
 Lincoln Minster School
 The London Oratory School
 Magdalen College School, Oxford
 The Minster School, Southwell
 The Minster School, York
 New College School, Oxford
 Norwich School (previously King Edward VI's Grammar School)
 The Pilgrims' School, Winchester
 Old Palace School, Croydon
 Truro School, Cornwall
 Polwhele House School, Cornwall
 Portsmouth Grammar School, Portsmouth 
 The Prebendal School, Chichester
 St Edmund's School, Canterbury
 St. Edward's College, Liverpool Metropolitan Cathedral
 St George's School, Windsor Castle
 St James' School, Grimsby
 St John's College School, Cambridge
 St John's College, Cardiff (RC)
 Reigate St Mary's School, Surrey
 St Mary's Music School, Edinburgh
 St Paul's Cathedral School, London
 Salisbury Cathedral School, Wiltshire
 Wells Cathedral School
 Westminster Abbey Choir School (CofE)
 Westminster Cathedral Choir School (RC)
 Whitgift School, Croydon
 Chorister School, Durham

United States
 Newark Boys Chorus school
 Pacific Boychoir Academy
 Saint Thomas Choir School
 St. Albans School (Washington, D.C.)
 St. Paul's Choir School
 The American Boychoir School (closed in 2017)
 Charlotte Choir School (Formerly The Choir School at St. Peter's)
 The Madeleine Choir School
 Westminster Choir College

See also
Cathedral school

References

External links
Choir Schools Association – contains information on 44 schools attached to cathedrals, churches and college chapels around the UK.

 
Choir schools